Gorki is a rural locality (a selo) in Orlovskoye Rural Settlement, Novousmansky District, Voronezh Oblast, Russia. The population was 389 as of 2010. There are 10 streets.

Geography 
Gorki is located 18 km northeast of Novaya Usman (the district's administrative centre) by road. Orlovo is the nearest rural locality.

References 

Rural localities in Novousmansky District